United Nations Security Council resolution 636, adopted on 30 August 1989, after reaffirming resolutions 608 (1988), 636 (1989) and learning of the deportation of five Palestinians by Israel in the occupied territories on 27 August 1989, the Council condemned the continued deportations and reaffirmed the applicability of the Fourth Geneva Convention referring to the protection of civilians in times of war.

The resolution also called upon Israel to ensure the safe and immediate return of those deported and to cease further deportations of civilians, which were usually expelled to Lebanon.

Resolution 641 was adopted with 14 votes to none, with one abstention from the United States.

See also
 Arab–Israeli conflict
 First Intifada
 Israeli–Palestinian conflict
 List of United Nations Security Council Resolutions 601 to 700 (1987–1991)

References

Text of the Resolution at undocs.org

External links
 

 0641
 0641
Israeli–Palestinian conflict and the United Nations
August 1989 events